Concentrate may also refer to:

Music
 Concentrated, Fear Zero's EP album
"Concentrate",  by Floater   Wake (Floater album) 2010. 
"Concentrate", song by Aim Frying the Fat 1995
 "Concentrate", a song by American singer-songwriter Demi Lovato, from her album Tell Me You Love Me
 "Concentrate", a song by American rapper Xzibit, from his album Full Circle

Other
 Concentrate (screenplay), a never-filmed 1958 screenplay by Russian film director Andrei Tarkovsky
 Ore concentrate, in extractive metallurgy, the product of benefaction with a higher grade than the feed.